Romano is a surname, also used as a given name.

Notable people with the name include:

As a given name

Art and writing
 Romano Amerio (1905–1997), Swiss Italian theologian
 Romano Bilenchi (1909–1989), Italian novelist, short story writer and essayist
 Romano Romanelli (1882–1968), Italian sculptor
 Romano Vio (1913–1984), Italian sculptor

Politics
 Romano Prodi (born 1939), former prime minister of Italy

Sports
 Romano Bonagura (1930–2010), Italian bobsledder, 1964 Winter Olympics
 Romano Denneboom (born 1981), Dutch footballer
 Romano Fenati (born 1996), Italian Grand Prix motorcycle racer
 Romano Perticone (born 1986), Italian footballer who plays for Cesena

Other people
 Romano Artioli (born 1932), Italian entrepreneur
 Romano Bobone (10th century), Italian cardinal
 Romano Carapecchia (1666–1738), Italian architect
 Romano Guardini (1885–1968), Italian-German Catholic priest

As a surname

Acting
 Andrea Romano (born 1955), voice actress
 Andy Romano (born 1941), American actor
 Carlo Romano (1908–1975), Italian film actor, screenwriter and voice actor
 Christy Carlson Romano (born 1984), American actress
 Gerardo Romano (born 1946), Argentine actor
 Janet Romano, American actress
 Larry Romano (born 1963), American actor
 Nina Romano, American actress
 Ray Romano (born 1957),  American actor and comedian
 Rino Romano (born 1969), Canadian voice actor

Art and writing
 Antonella Romano (born 1962), French historian of science
 Antoniazzo Romano (1430s–1510s), Italian Early Renaissance painter
Fabrizio Romano (born 1993), Italian journalist
 Giulio Romano (c. 1490–1546), 16th-century Italian artist
 Lou Romano (born 1972), member of the Art Department in Pixar Animation Studios
 Lalla Romano (1906–2001), Italian novelist, poet, and journalist
 Rose Romano (born 1959), American poet

Music
 Aldo Romano (born 1941), Italian-French jazz drummer
 Daniel Romano (born 1985), Canadian musician
 Frank Romano (born 1970), American born guitarist, songwriter and record producer
 Tony Romano (musician) (1915–2005), American guitarist and performer

Politics
 Francesco Saverio Romano (born 1964), Italian politician
 Robert E. Romano (1905–1956), American lawter and politician

Sports
 Ángel Romano (1893–1972), Uruguayan footballer
 Rubén Omar Romano (born 1958), Argentine-Mexican footballer
 Serge Romano (born 1964), French footballer
 Luke Romano (born 1986), New Zealand rugby union footballer
 Al Romano (born 1954), American football player
 Johnny Romano (1934–2019), American baseball player
 Mike Romano (born 1972), American baseball player
 Moshe Romano (born 1946), Israeli footballer
 Jason Romano (born 1979), former professional baseball player
 Jordan Romano (born 1993), Canadian baseball player
 Tom Romano (born 1958), baseball player
 Sal Romano (born 1993), baseball player
 Megan Romano (born 1991), American swimmer
 Tony Romano (ice hockey) (born 1988), American ice hockey player
 Yossef Romano (1940–1972), Israeli athlete murdered at Munich Olympics

Other people
 Antonio Romano (disambiguation), multiple people
 Da Romano, a medieval Italian family
 Carmine Romano (1935–2011), New York mobster and captain in the Genovese crime family
 Benito Romano (born 1950), Puerto Rican lawyer
 Carla Romano (born 1969), Scottish journalist
 Edward A. Romano, American business executive
 John Romano (disambiguation), multiple people
 Joseph L. Romano, officer in the United States Air Force
 Morgan Romano (born 1998), American model and beauty queen
 Tony Romano (disambiguation), multiple people
 U. Roberto Romano (1956–2013), American filmmaker

Fictional characters
 Romano, a character in the American television series Ghost Whisperer
 Italy Romano (Lovino Vargas), a character in the Japanese webcomic Hetalia: Axis Powers
 Robert Romano (ER), a doctor from the American television series ER
 Vic Romano, a character in the American television series Most Extreme Elimination Challenge

See also 
 Roman (given name)